Sengseng is an Austronesian language spoken by about 1750 individuals in the southwest interior of West New Britain Province, Papua New Guinea on the island of New Britain.

References

Pasismanua languages
Languages of West New Britain Province
Vulnerable languages